Marko Bulat (born 30 Juлѕ 1997) is a Serbian football defender.

Club career

Jagodina
He made his Serbian SuperLiga debut for Jagodina on away match versus Radnički Kragujevac on 28 May 2014.

References

External links
 
 

1997 births
Living people
People from Smederevska Palanka
Association football defenders
Serbian footballers
FK Jagodina players
Hellas Verona F.C. players
S.S.D. Varese Calcio players
OFK Bačka players
FK Dinamo Vranje players
FK BSK Batajnica players
Liga III players
ACS Foresta Suceava players
Serbian SuperLiga players
Serbian expatriate footballers
Serbian expatriate sportspeople in Italy
Expatriate footballers in Italy
Serbian expatriate sportspeople in Romania
Expatriate footballers in Romania